"Rendezvous at Big Gulch (Terror in the Neighborhood)" is the third episode produced (but fifth episode broadcast) of the short-lived TV series Police Squad!. The episode was directed by Reza Badiyi and written by Nancy Steen and Neil Thompson. As usual, the episode was produced by Robert K. Weiss.

The episode refers to Mommie Dearest (released by Paramount Pictures, whose television division produced Police Squad!), where a Joan Crawford lookalike pays off the mob at the "Mommie Dearest Day Care Center".

Dutch Genderson is a clear spoof on the James Bond character Ernst Stavro Blofeld.  He is introduced sitting in a chair stroking a cat, and his face is not initially revealed. Even his bending low upon his announcement, "When I'm through with him, he'll be dead!" is meant as a (more subtle) joke, since up to You Only Live Twice Blofeld's face is never seen in the movies.

Plot
Two gangsters, later revealed as Rocky and Leo, collect protection money from several local shops. A ballet teacher, Jill, cannot pay because of bad business and is beaten. Frank Drebin, the detective, interviews the woman but she seems reluctant to cooperate, saying she did not get a good look.

Frank and Ed discover the gangsters are working all across the country. Wanting to catch them in the act, Frank opens up a locksmith store along with fellow detective Norberg (a store that actually says on the window "A.N. Abandoned Locksmith Shop.").

Rocky and Leo's offer of protection is turned down. They assault the store with machine guns, which is not noticed until they toss in a rock with a note. Frank drives the rock (backwards) to the lab. Analysis of the note and the rock reveals nothing.

Rocky and Leo try to intimidate the two men again, but are beaten and left dazed on the street. The entire neighborhood sees this and cheers.

After Frank's victory, Leo and Rocky are seen talking with their boss Dutch Genderson, who tells them that when he's through with Frank, Frank will be dead.

Act II: Gesundheit 

When Norberg has another delivery a beautiful woman called Stella comes into the shop. She is trying to seduce Frank; she tells Frank she wants her key duplicated 50 times and that Frank can keep the 50th key himself (the other 49 are intended for the Chicago Bears). Two weeks later, when Frank tries to open the door with his key, Stella starts shooting through the door. Frank, however, isn't behind the door, so when he comes in, he grabs Stella. The phone rings, and Stella is made to pick it up. The person calling is Dutch Genderson, providing Frank the opportunity to set up a trap for Dutch. After the phone call, Frank arrests Stella on an attempted murder charge. Before going to meet Dutch, Frank goes to his regular source of answers, Johnny the Snitch. Johnny tells Frank about Dutch's bad childhood. All Dutch has ever known is the world of crime. Frank then asks Johnny for concrete evidence against Dutch. Johnny gives Frank some photostats that make Dutch look pretty dirty. When Frank arrives at Dutch's office, Dutch attempts to shoot Frank, but before he has a chance, Frank shows him the photostat that Johnny gave him. Instead of trying to arrest Dutch, Frank tries to become part of his organization. Dutch tells Frank to kill the old tailor as his first assignment. When going to the tailor's store, Leo and Rocky grab Frank and tell him that there has been a change of plans: they're hitting a dance teacher. When Frank comes in the other policemen have just left and Jill blows Frank's cover by calling him lieutenant. A big fight starts inside the ballet school. Frank wins the fight and tells Jill to call Police Squad.

Recurring jokes
Tonight's special guest star: Florence Henderson, gunned down while she was singing in the kitchen, surrounded by bottles of vegetable oil (she was a commercial spokesperson for Wesson Oil at the time). Henderson later made a cameo appearance in Naked Gun : The Final Insult, as herself nominated for an Oscar.
Next week's experiment: Bring those magazines you found under your father's bed.
Johnny's next customer: A fireman wanting to know the best way to extinguish a furniture warehouse fire.
Freeze frame gag: When Ed pours Frank some coffee, the episode ends and the coffee spills all over the place.

References

External links

 

Police Squad! episodes
1982 American television episodes